Bubba Gump Shrimp Company is an American seafood restaurant chain inspired by the 1994 film Forrest Gump. As of October 2022, 34 Bubba Gump Shrimp Co. restaurants operate worldwide. 22 of these locations are in the United States, four are in Mexico, three are in Japan, and one each are in the Mainland China, Hong Kong, Indonesia, Canada and Qatar. The company is based in Houston, Texas, and has been a division of Landry's Restaurants since 2010.

The first Bubba Gump restaurant opened in 1996 in Monterey, California by Rusty Pelican Restaurants in partnership with Paramount, the distributor of Forrest Gump. The Bubba Gump restaurant is named after the film's characters Benjamin Buford "Bubba" Blue and Forrest Gump. In the film, Bubba suggested getting in the shrimping business and, ultimately, Forrest pursued the idea after Bubba's death in the Vietnam War.

History 
In 1995, entrepreneur Anthony Zolezzi bought the rights to the name “Bubba Gump Shrimp Co.” from Paramount Pictures in an attempt to turn around a financially troubled seafood company, Meridian Products.

The Bubba Gump Shrimp Co. line of packaged shrimp products were sold in supermarkets across the US and in international markets. Zolezzi was approached by a friend in the seafood restaurant business about licensing the name. Zolezzi consulted with Paramount and the Rusty Pelican restaurant chain to launch the first Bubba Gump Shrimp Co. restaurant in Monterey, California in 1996. Its success led to its franchising on an international scale.

In November 2010, Landry's, Inc. acquired Bubba Gump Shrimp Co. for an undisclosed amount. The Bubba Gump Shrimp Co. purchase also included a lone Rusty Pelican in Newport Beach, California. As a result the restaurant’s headquarters moved from Hollywood, California to Houston, Texas. 

As the name implies, Bubba Gump Shrimp Co.'s menu consists mostly of shrimp dishes. It serves other seafood, as well as Southern and Cajun cuisine, as the characters of Forrest and Bubba were from Alabama. The restaurant offers dishes named after characters in the movie, like Jenny's Catch and the restaurant's bestseller Forrest's Seafood Feast. Restaurants display movie memorabilia throughout the restaurant. Guests can play Forrest Gump movie trivia and can signal their waiter with a “Stop, Forrest, Stop” sign. The mascot of the chain is a shrimp named Shrimp Louie.

Miscellaneous

Employee social media policy 
In 2013, a former Bubba Gump employee claimed that the social media policy in the company's employee handbook had a restrictive effect on employees’ rights by prohibiting them from discussing their jobs online. In 2015, a National Labor Relations Board administrative law judge ruled that Bubba Gump did not violate employees’ rights as they did not explicitly prohibit employees from discussing job-related subjects, but only expected them to do so in a civil manner. There have been many cases in the last few years in which the National Labor Relations Board found companies social media policies to be excessively broad, and ruled in favor of the employee(s).

Chris Pratt
When actor Chris Pratt was 19, he was discovered while working as a waiter at the Bubba Gump Shrimp Co. in Maui, Hawaii. He waited on the table of actress/director Rae Dawn Chong, who had starred in one of Pratt's favorite films, Commando (1985). Chong offered Pratt a role in a short movie she was directing.

See also
 List of seafood restaurants
 Forrest Gump

References

External links 

 
 NY Magazine: Bubba Gump Shrimp Co.

Landry's Inc.
Restaurant franchises
Film-themed restaurants
Restaurant chains in the United States
Seafood restaurants in the United States
Restaurants established in 1996
Restaurants in Monterey County, California
Companies based in Houston
1996 establishments in California
2010 mergers and acquisitions
Fast-food seafood restaurants